Paula Schulz-Hanssen (born 1 April 2003) is a German amateur golfer. She won the 2019 European Young Masters and the 2020 European Ladies Amateur.

Amateur career
Schulz-Hanssen, as a member of the German National Team, won the European Girls' Team Championship and was runner-up at the European Ladies' Team Championship in 2020 behind the Swedish team. The year before, she won the European Young Masters both individually and with the team.

In 2019, she recorded a victory at the Doral-Publix Junior Classic, and advanced to the quarterfinals in The R&A's Girls Amateur Championship. She finished in the top-10 in all but one of her six starts in 2020, including a win at the Swiss Ladies Amateur.

Schulz-Hanssen captured the 2020 European Ladies Amateur Championship, after rounds with 66, 66, 70 and 69. She had a one stroke lead after her fifth birdie of the day on the 16th hole, however she conceded her first double bogey of the championship on the last hole, dropping to 271 strokes (–13), level with Chloé Salort of France. A three-hole play-off battle for the title ensued, where Schulz-Hanssen took a one shot lead on the first hole with a birdie, and secured the title with another birdie on the third hole.

In 2021, she won the Junior Solheim Cup with the European team.

Amateur wins
2018 BWGV-Ranglistenturnier Mädchen 2
2019 European Young Masters, Doral-Publix Junior Classic 
2020 European Ladies Amateur, Swiss International Ladies Championship

Source:

Team appearances
Amateur
Junior Solheim Cup (representing Europe): 2019, 2021
European Young Masters (representing Germany): 2019 (winners)
World Junior Girls Championship (representing Germany): 2019
European Girls' Team Championship (representing Germany): 2019, 2020 (winners)
European Ladies' Team Championship (representing Germany): 2020, 2021

Source:

References

External links
Paula Schulz-Hanssen at Golf Club St. Leon-Rot

German female golfers
Sportspeople from Heidelberg
2003 births
Living people
21st-century German women